CBRT may refer to:

 CBRT-DT, a television station (channel 9) licensed to serve Calgary, Alberta, Canada
 Central Bank of the Republic of Turkey
 Cube root